Scytodes fusca, the brown spitting spider, is a species of spitting spider in the family Scytodidae. It is found in Central and Southern America, has been introduced into Europe, tropical Africa, Seychelles, Myanmar, China, Japan, and Hawaii.

References

External links

 

Scytodidae
Articles created by Qbugbot
Spiders described in 1837